The Ambassador of the United Kingdom to the Republic of Zimbabwe is the United Kingdom's foremost diplomatic representative in Zimbabwe, and head of the UK's diplomatic mission in Harare.

The embassy dates back to the establishment of a High Commission in Salisbury, Southern Rhodesia, to the Federation of Rhodesia and Nyasaland from 1955 to 1963, and to Southern Rhodesia again following the end of the Federation from 1963. The High Commission was withdrawn on 12 November 1965, following the Unilateral Declaration of Independence of Rhodesia the previous day. Zimbabwe became an independent nation in 1980 following the Lancaster House Agreement on 21 December 1979. Initially Zimbabwe was a member of the British Commonwealth so the UK's diplomatic representatives were High Commissioners. Zimbabwe withdrew from the Commonwealth in 2003 and since then the UK's representatives have been Ambassadors.

Emmerson Mnagagwa, the President of Zimbabwe has stated that Zimbabwe will seek a return to its membership of the Commonwealth during 2018, following in the footsteps of The Gambia, which returned to its status as a republic in the Commonwealth of Nations on 8 February 2018. If this does occur, then the UK's head of mission in Zimbabwe will again be a High Commissioner.

List of Heads of Mission

High Commissioners to the Federation of Rhodesia and Nyasaland

1955–1961: Maurice Rupert Metcalf
1961–1963: Lord Alport
1963–1963: John Baines Johnston

High Commissioners to Southern Rhodesia

1963–1965: John Baines Johnston

High Commissioners

1980–1983: Robin Byatt
1983–1985: Sir Martin Ewans
1985–1989: Sir Ramsay Melhuish
1989–1992: Sir Keiran Prendergast
1992–1995: Sir Richard Dales
1995–1998: Martin Williams
1998–2001: Peter Longworth
2001–2003: Sir Brian Donnelly

Ambassadors

2003–2004: Sir Brian Donnelly
2004–2006: Roderick Pullen
2006–2009: Andrew Pocock
2009–2011: Mark Canning
2011–2014: Deborah Bronnert
2014–2018: Catriona Laing

2019–: Melanie Robinson

Controversy

Ambassador Pocock, along with other foreign diplomats, was seized and threatened by Zimbabwe police briefly on 13 May 2008 while they tried to investigate violence against Zimbabwe's rural population since the March 2008 elections.

References

External links

UK and Zimbabwe, gov.uk

Zimbabwe
Zimbabwe
 
 
Zimbabwe and the Commonwealth of Nations
United Kingdom